The signalling system used on the railway network in Finland comprises color-light signals and fixed signs, used together with the Automatic Train Control system ATP-VR/RHK (an EBICAB 900 system better known as JKV).

Main signals
The main signal can have any of the following aspects:

If a main signal doesn't protect any switches or the speed restriction on a diverging route is the same as straight route, the signal doesn't need to show the Proceed 35 aspect and therefore the yellow bottom light may be absent. The two lamp version of the old system has the lights reversed, i.e. red at the top and green at the bottom.

Distant signals
The distant signal is located at least  before the main signal.
It may also be located in the same post with a main signal, below it. In this combined arrangement, whenever the main signal shows a stop aspect, the distant signal doesn't show any aspect at all.

A distant signal can have any of the following aspects:

Note: Although the green light of the old system distant signal used in Helsinki area is named Expect Proceed aspect, the next main signal may in fact be showing the Proceed 35 aspect. Therefore, the driver has to act as if the signal aspect is indeed Expect 35.

Block signals
A block signal can show any of the following three aspects:

Block signals are being replaced by combinations of main and distant signals, and no new block signals will be installed.

Dwarf signals

A dwarf signal is used for controlling shunting movements. It can have any of the following aspects:

A dwarf signal may also be placed in conjunction with a main signal. If the main signal shows any other aspect than Stop, the dwarf signal shows the Proceed with caution aspect.

Bridge signals

Bridge signals are small signals used to display the orientation of a moveable bridge. They can have any of the following aspects:

Repeaters
Repeaters are sometimes used to repeat the aspect of the main signal in the Helsinki area in places where the main signal is not clearly visible.

Helsinki Metro

The Helsinki Metro signals differ from those used by the railways.

Main signals
Some aspects may be shown using a signal with only three lights, pictured on the right.

Distant signals

References

External links

Railway signalling in Finland